Rearea is the goddess of joy in Tahitian mythology.

References 
 Robert D. Craig: Dictionary of Polynesian Mythology, 1989

Tahiti and Society Islands goddesses